The following is a non-exhaustive list of Category III films produced in Hong Kong. According to the Hong Kong motion picture rating system introduced in 1988, the restriction applicable to Category III films is thus defined: "No persons younger than 18 years of age are permitted to rent, purchase, or watch this film in the cinema." This applies to films produced in Hong Kong or elsewhere.

The Category III rating is applicable to films produced anywhere. The list below contains only Category III films produced in Hong Kong.

Pre–1988
Films released before 1988 were rated retroactively when the rating system was introduced.
 The Golden Lotus (1974)
 Love Swindlers (1976)
 Dangerous Encounters of the First Kind (1980)
 Devil Fetus (1983)
 Seeding of a Ghost (1983)
 Possessed (1983)
 Possessed II (1984)
 The Rape After (1984)
 Hong Kong Godfather (1985)
 The Seventh Curse (1986)

1988–1999
This period is generally considered as the one when most Category III Hong Kong films were produced.

1988
 Men Behind the Sun (1988)
 Her Vengeance (1988)
 School on Fire (1988)
 Gunmen (1988)
1989
 Bloody Brotherhood (1989)
 Triads: The Inside Story (1989)
 Runaway Blues (1989)
1990
 Bullet in the Head (1990)
 An Eye for an Eye (1990)
 Erotic Ghost Story (1990)
 Queen of Temple Street (1990)
1991
 The Blue Jean Monster (1991)
 Fist of Fury 1991 (1991)
 Sex and Zen (1991)
 Riki-Oh: The Story of Ricky (1991)
 Robotrix (1991)
1992
 Dr. Lamb (1992)
 My Wife's Lover (1992)
 Naked Killer (1992)
1993
 Perfect Exchange (1993)
 My Better Half (1993)
 Love to Kill (1993)
 Crazy Love (1993) aka. The Fruit Is Ripe 1
 Crime Story (1993)
 Daughter of Darkness (1993)
 Run and Kill (1993)
 The Untold Story (1993)
 Retribution Sight Unseen (1993) aka. Three Days of a Blind Girl
 Raped by an Angel (1993) Note that Raped by an Angel 2 and 5 are rated as Category IIB.
 Taxi Hunter (1993)
 Women on the Run (1993)
1994
 Beauty Evil Rose (1994) aka. The Beauty's Evil Roses
 Daughter of Darkness 2 (1994)
 A Day Without Policemen (1994)
 Dream Lovers (1994)
 Brother of Darkness (1994)
 A Chinese Torture Chamber Story (1994)
 Fatal Encounter (1994)
 Red to Kill (1994)
 The Tragic Fantasy - Tiger of Wanchai (1994)
 Twenty Something (1994)
 The Underground Banker (1994)
1995
 Eternal Evil of Asia (1995)
1996
 Sex and Zen II (1996)
 Viva Erotica (1996)
 Ebola Syndrome (1996)
1997
 The Fruit Is Swelling (1997) aka. The Fruit Is Ripe 2
 Happy Together (1997)
 Intruder (1997)
1998
 Nude Fear (1998)
 Young and Dangerous: The Prequel (1998)
 Sex and Zen III (1998)
 The Untold Story 2 (1998)
 Raped by an Angel 3: Sexual Fantasy of the Chief Executive (1998)
 A Chinese Torture Chamber Story 2 (1998)
1999
 The Fruit Is Ripe 3 (1999)
 Iron Sister (1999)
 A Lamb in Despair (1999)
 Raped by an Angel 4: The Raper's Union (1999)

2000–15

 Spacked Out (2000)
 There Is a Secret in My Soup (2001)
 Human Pork Chop (2001),
 3 Extremes II (2002)
 Fu Bo (2003)
 Sexy Soccer (2003)
 Three... Extremes (2004)
 Ab-normal Beauty (2004)
 Dumplings (2004)
 Election (2005)
 SPL: Sha Po Lang (2005)
 Election 2 (2006)
 Dog Bite Dog (2006)
 Exiled (2006)
 The Heavenly Kings (2006; rated for explicit profanity)
 Whispers and Moans (2007), directed by Herman Yau
 Lust, Caution (2007)
 Mad Detective (2007)
 Gong Tau: An Oriental Black Magic (2007)
 Fatal Move (2008)
 Hong Kong Bronx (2008)
 Besieged City (2008)
 The Forbidden Legend Sex & Chopsticks (2008)
 The Forbidden Legend Sex & Chopsticks 2 (2009)
 The Unbelievable (2009)
 A Very Short Life (2009)
 Shinjuku Incident (2009)
 Dream Home (2010)
 Revenge: A Love Story (2010)
 Love in a Puff (2010; rated for positive portrayal of smoking)
 3D Sex and Zen: Extreme Ecstasy (2011)
 The 33D Invader (2011)
 Vulgaria (2012)
 Tales from the Dark 1 (2013)
 Tales from the Dark 2 (2013)
 3D Naked Ambition (2014)
 The Gigolo (2015)
 The Gigolo 2 (2015)

See also
 Cinema of Hong Kong. See "Category III films" section.
 List of NC-17 rated films
 Video nasty

Notes

References

External links
 Random Acts of Sensible Violence: Genre, Hong Kong Censorship, and the Brief Ascent of Category III
 Television and Entertainment Licensing Authority website: database search for films classified by the Film Censorship Authority since 2004
 HK cinemagic list of Hong Kong Category III films
 Categorize Me: A History of Hong Kong's Category III Genre

Cinema of Hong Kong
Category III
Softcore pornography